The CXFS file system (Clustered XFS) is a proprietary shared disk file system designed by Silicon Graphics (SGI) specifically to be used in a storage area network (SAN) environment.

A significant difference between CXFS and other distributed file systems is that data and metadata are managed separately from each other. CXFS provides direct access to data via the SAN for all hosts which will act as clients. This means that a client is able to access file data via the fiber connection to the SAN, rather than over a local area network such as Ethernet  (as is the case in most other distributed file systems, like NFS). File metadata however, is managed via a metadata broker. The metadata communication is performed via TCP/IP and Ethernet.

Another difference is that file locks are managed by the metadata broker, rather than the individual host clients. This results in the elimination of a number of problems which typically plague distributed file systems.

Though CXFS supports having a heterogeneous environment (including Solaris, Linux, Mac OS X, AIX and Windows), either SGI's IRIX Operating System or Linux is required to be installed on the host which acts as the metadata broker.

See also 
 List of file systems
 Shared disk file system

External links 
 SGI info about CXFS

Distributed file systems supported by the Linux kernel
IRIX
Shared disk file systems